Salle Park is a country house in Norfolk, England, near the village of Salle and about  north-west of Norwich. The house is a Grade II* listed building, and the park and garden are listed Grade II in Historic England's Register of Parks and Gardens.

It is the home of Sir John Woolmer White, 4th Baronet; the estate has been owned by the White family for over 100 years.

Description

History
The current house, replacing an earlier house which stood near the northern boundary of the park, was built in 1763 for Edward Hase, by an unknown architect. It passed to the Jodrell family when his daughter Vertue married the dramatist Richard Paul Jodrell, her second cousin, in 1772. In 1890 Major Timothy White, ancestor of the present owner, acquired the estate.

House
The house is in Palladian style. The north side has a central stone portico. The south side, facing the garden, has a façade of 7 bays with a three-bay pediment; the central door has a stone pediment with ionic pilasters. Sir Woolmer White, 1st Baronet, added a west wing, and an east wing containing an orangery.

Gardens and estate

There is a Georgian-style garden south of the house, with formal lawns and an avenue of clipped yews, extending to a curved ha-ha; beyond this the grounds are planted with trees and shrubs.

See also
 Jodrell baronets
 White baronets

References

Grade II* listed buildings in Norfolk
Grade II listed parks and gardens in Norfolk
Country houses in Norfolk
Gardens in Norfolk